Blues for Harvey is an album by American saxophonist Johnny Griffin recorded at the Jazzhus Montmartre in 1973 and released on the SteepleChase label.

Reception

The AllMusic review by Ken Dryden states, "There are some exciting moments, but overall, this live record falls just a bit short of essential for hard bop fans."

Track listing
All compositions by Johnny Griffin except where noted.
 "That Party Upstairs" - 14:42
 "Alone Again" - 8:42
 "Sound Track Blues" - 6:13 Bonus track on CD reissue 		
 "The Theme" (Traditional) - 0:26 Bonus track on CD reissue
 "Soft and Furry" - 11:34
 "Blues for Harvey" - 12:53 		
 "Rhythm-a-Ning/The Theme" (Thelonious Monk/Traditional) - 2:36

Personnel
Johnny Griffin – tenor saxophone
Kenny Drew – piano
Mads Vinding – bass
Ed Thigpen – drums

References 

SteepleChase Records live albums
Johnny Griffin live albums
1973 live albums
Albums recorded at Jazzhus Montmartre